State leaders in the 12th century BC – State leaders in the 10th century BC – State leaders by year

This is a list of state leaders in the 11th century BC (1100–1001 BC).

Africa: Northeast

Egypt: New Kingdom

Twentieth Dynasty of the New Kingdom (complete list) –
Ramesses XI, Pharaoh (1107–1077 BC)

Egypt: Third Intermediate Period

Twenty-first Dynasty of the Third Intermediate Period (complete list) –
Smendes, Pharaoh (1077–1051 BC)
Amenemnisu, Pharaoh (1051–1047 BC)
Psusennes I, Pharaoh (1047–1001 BC)
Amenemope, Pharaoh (1001–992 BC)

Kush

Kingdom of Kush (complete list) –
Kandake Makeda, King (c.1005–950 BC)

Asia

Asia: East

China

Shang, China (complete list) –
Di Yi, King (c.1101–c.1076 BC)
Zhou, King (c.1075–1046 BC)

Zhou, China: Western Zhou (complete list) –
Wen, King (c.1099–c.1050 BC)
Wu, King (c.1046–1043 BC)
Dan, Regent, Duke (c.1042 BC)
Cheng, King (c.1042–1021 BC)
Kang, King (c.1020–996 BC)

Asia: Southeast
Vietnam
Hồng Bàng dynasty (complete list) –
Bính line, (c.1161–c.1055 BC)
Đinh line, (c.1054–c.969 BC)

Asia: West
Kingdom of united Israel –
Chronologies as established by Albright
Saul, King (1030–1010 BC)
Ish-bosheth, King of northern Israel (c.1000 BC)
David, King (1000–962 BC)

Assyria: Middle Assyrian Period
Tiglath-Pileser I, King (c.1115–1076 BC)
Asharid-apal-Ekur, King (c.1076–1074 BC)
Ashur-bel-kala, King (c.1074–1056 BC)
Eriba-Adad II, King (c.1056–1054 BC)
Shamshi-Adad IV, King (c.1054–1050 BC)
Ashur-nasir-pal I, King (c.1050–1031 BC)
Shalmaneser II, King (c.1031–1019 BC)
Ashur-nirari IV, King (c.1019–1013 BC)
Ashur-rabi II, King (c.1013–972 BC)

Dynasty IV of Babylon, from Isin
Enlil-nadin-apli, King (c.1103–1100 BC)
Marduk-nadin-ahhe, King (c.1100–1082 BC)
Marduk-shapik-zeri, King (c.1082–1069 BC)
Adad-apla-iddina, King (c.1069–1046 BC)
Marduk-ahhe-eriba, King (c.1046 BC)
Marduk-zer-X, King (c.1046–1033 BC)
Nabu-shum-libur, King (c.1033–1025 BC)

Dynasty V of Babylon
Simbar-shipak, King (c.1025–1008 BC)
Ea-mukin-zeri, King (c.1008 BC)
Kashshu-nadin-ahi, King (c.1008–1004 BC)

Dynasty VI of Babylon
Eulmash-shakin-shumi, King (c.1004–987 BC)

Diauehi –
Sien, King (c.1120–1100 BC)

Elam: Shutrukid dynasty (complete list) –
Humban-Numena II, King (early 11th century BC)
Shutruk-Nahhunte II, King (mid-11th century BC)
Shutur-Nahhunte I, King (mid-11th century BC)

Europe: Balkans

Athens (complete list) –
Melanthus, King (1126–1089 BC) presumed legendary or semi-historical
Codrus, King (1089–1068 BC) presumed legendary or semi-historical
Medon, hereditary perpetual Archon (1068–1048 BC)
Acastus, hereditary perpetual Archon (1048–1012 BC)
Archippus, hereditary perpetual Archon (1012–993 BC)

References

State Leaders
-
11th-century BC rulers